The modern constellation Leo  Minor lies across one of the quadrants symbolized by the Vermilion Bird of the South (南方朱雀, Nán Fāng Zhū Què), and Three Enclosures (三垣, Sān Yuán), that divide the sky in traditional Chinese uranography.

The name of the western constellation in modern Chinese is 小獅座 (xiǎo shī zuò), meaning "the small lion constellation".

Stars

The map of Chinese constellation in constellation Leo Minor area consists of :

See also
Traditional Chinese star names
Chinese constellations

References

External links
Leo Minor – Chinese associations
 香港太空館研究資源
 中國星區、星官及星名英譯表
 天象文學
 台灣自然科學博物館天文教育資訊網
 中國古天文
 中國古代的星象系統

Astronomy in China
Leo Minor